Greaser or Greasers may refer to:
 Greaser (subculture), a subculture that developed in the United States in the 1950s
Rocker (subculture) a bike subculture that started in the United Kingdom in the 1950s
 Greaser (derogatory), an ethnic slur against Latino, Italian, or Greek Americans
 Greaser, another name for Oiler (occupation), a worker whose main job is to oil and grease machinery
In aviation, a smooth or soft landing with no noticeable bounce after contact with the landing surface
 The Greasers, a fictional gang from S. E. Hinton's book The Outsiders
 The Greasers, a fictional clique from the video game Bully

See also
 Grease (disambiguation)
 Greasy (disambiguation)